"Kick Ass" is a song recorded by Bryan Adams. It was first released on December 9, 2021 as the third single from the album So Happy It Hurts.

Background
The song has a strong rock connotation and was written and composed by Adams and Robert John "Mutt" Lange. "Kick Ass" also features a spoken word introduction, recorded by John Cleese: "In the beginning, God created the heavens and the Earth, then he created the waters and the land, and then he created man", Cleese says in his introduction. "But man degenerated and descended into the black hole of creating bad music… There was no rock music!" 

Adams said, ""Kick Ass" begins with an introductory sermon by John Cleese that sums up the song. There is not enough rock and roll in the world ... period! More guitars, more drums, let's clap our hands ... let's rock!"

The song premiered as the opening of Adams' concerts November 10-20, 2021, at Encore Theater in Las Vegas.

Music video
The video of the song was published on Adams' official Youtube channel.

Credits and personnel 
 Bryan Adams —  lead and background  vocals, hammond  organ, bass, electric  guitar, producer, drums
 Keith Scott — lead  guitar
 Robert John "Mutt" Lange — keyboards, producer, background  vocals
 John Cleese — spoken  word (intro)
 Hayden Watson — sound  engineer
 Olle Romo — sound  engineer
 Emily Lazar — sound  engineer
 Chris Allgood — sound  engineer

References

2021 singles
2021 songs
Bryan Adams songs
Songs written by Bryan Adams
BMG Rights Management singles
Songs written by Robert John "Mutt" Lange